Marko Mlinarić (born 1 September 1960) is a Croatian retired footballer who played as a midfielder.

Club career
Nicknamed Mlinka, he was part of the Dinamo Zagreb squad that won the 1981–82 Yugoslav First League. He made his debut for them against Osijek on 8 April 1978 and played a total of 530 matches for them, official and unofficial.

In 1987 he was named the Yugoslav Footballer of the Year.

International career
He made his debut for Yugoslavia in an April 1983 friendly match away against France, coming on as a 46th-minute substitute for Mehmed Baždarević, and earned a total of 17 caps, scoring 1 goal. According to Mlinarić, he disqualified himself for the 1984 European Football Championships because he chose to do his military service that year. His final international was a September 1988 friendly away against Spain. He also played one unofficial game for Croatia, an October 1990 friendly match against the United States, but Croatia was still part of Yugoslavia at the time.

Honours
Dinamo Zagreb
Yugoslav First League: 1
 1982
Croatian First League: 1
 1996
Yugoslav Cup: 2
 1980, 1983
Croatian Cup: 1
 1996

References

External links
 

Marko Marko Mlinarić profile at the Serbia national football team website 

1960 births
Living people
Footballers from Zagreb
Association football midfielders
Yugoslav footballers
Yugoslavia international footballers
Olympic footballers of Yugoslavia
Footballers at the 1980 Summer Olympics
Croatian footballers
Croatia international footballers
Dual internationalists (football)
GNK Dinamo Zagreb players
AJ Auxerre players
AS Cannes players
HNK Segesta players
Yugoslav First League players
Ligue 1 players
Croatian Football League players
Yugoslav expatriate footballers
Expatriate footballers in France
Yugoslav expatriate sportspeople in France